Hamilton, Joe Frank & Reynolds is the debut album by the band of the same name. Two singles were lifted from this album: "Annabella" and the band's first top 40 hit "Don't Pull Your Love."

Track listing

Personnel

Hamilton, Joe Frank & Reynolds
Dan Hamilton - lead vocals (1, 2, & 4-9), backing vocals, guitar
Joe Frank Carollo - lead vocals (1-5, 9 & 11), backing vocals, bass
Tommy Reynolds - lead vocals (9 & 10), flute solo (1), vibe solo (11), backing vocals, keyboards

Charts
Album - Billboard (United States)

Singles - Billboard (United States)

References

1971 debut albums
Dunhill Records albums
Hamilton, Joe Frank & Reynolds albums